Robert Dick Wilson, PhD, DD (February 4, 1856 – October 11, 1930) was an American linguist and Presbyterian Old Testament scholar who devoted his life to prove the reliability of the Hebrew Bible. In his quest to determine the accuracy of the original manuscripts, Wilson learned 45 languages, including Hebrew, Aramaic, and Greek, as well as all the languages into which the Scriptures had been translated up to 600 AD.

Biography
Wilson was born in Indiana, Pennsylvania. He proved himself an outstanding language student even as an undergraduate. While at Princeton University, he was able to read the New Testament in nine languages. He graduated from Princeton at the age of 20, later receiving a master's degree and doctorate before doing post-graduate work in Germany at the Humboldt University of Berlin. In 1883, Wilson became Professor of the Old Testament at Western Theological Seminary (later known as Pittsburgh Theological Seminary), where he had done some of his graduate studies. In 1900, he returned to Princeton as the William Henry Green Professor of Semitic Languages and Old Testament Criticism at Princeton Theological Seminary.

Throughout his career, he opposed the higher criticism, which held that the Bible was inaccurate on many points and not historically reliable. Professor Wilson wrote, "I have come to the conviction that no man knows enough to attack the veracity of the Old Testament. Every time when anyone has been able to get together enough documentary 'proofs' to undertake an investigation, the biblical facts in the original text have victoriously met the test" (quoted in R. Pache, The Inspiration and Authority of Scripture).

In the late 1920s, he left Princeton to teach at the new, conservative Westminster Theological Seminary. Among his other works, Wilson contributed articles to the International Standard Bible Encyclopedia, a noted Bible reference of the early 20th century.

Works

Books

 - in one volume

Articles

Manuscripts

See also 
Christian apologetics (field of study concerned with the defense of Christianity)

References

Bibliography

Jackson, Wayne.  "The Remarkable Robert Dick Wilson."  Christian Courier (24 April 2000).  Online.  Last updated 28 January 2005.  Viewed 3 April 2005.
 David B. Calhoun, Princeton Seminary, Vol. 2: The Majestic Testimony 1869-1929 (Edinburgh: Banner of Truth Trust, 1996), pp. 211–212.
 Walter C. Kaiser, "Robert Dick Wilson," in Bible Interpreters of the Twentieth Century: A Selection of Evangelical Voices, Walter A. Elwell and J. D. Weaver, eds., (Grand Rapids: Baker, 1999), pp. 73–81.

External links 
Is the higher criticism Scholarly? By Robert Dick Wilson, Ph.D., D.D.
Who's in Charge Here?
Robert Dick Wilson, from Book of Daniel Study Resources
Robert Dick Wilson Papers, at the Presbyterian Church in America (PCA) Historical Center
Humorous anecdote about Dr. Robert Dick Wilson, from inSpire (Summer/Fall 2000 issue; Vol. 5 No. 1), the magazine of Princeton Theological Seminary.
Today in History (February 4) from Concordia Historical Institute, Lutheran Church–Missouri Synod
Brief biography of Robert Dick Wilson

1856 births
1930 deaths
Linguists from the United States
American Presbyterians
American Calvinist and Reformed theologians
American people of Scotch-Irish descent
People from Indiana, Pennsylvania
Westminster Theological Seminary faculty
Princeton University alumni
Princeton Theological Seminary faculty
Humboldt University of Berlin alumni
20th-century Calvinist and Reformed theologians
Pittsburgh Theological Seminary faculty
Old Testament scholars